Two ships of the Royal Navy were named Banshee.

 , a packet boat in service 1847–1864
 , a destroyer in service 1894–1912

Royal Navy ship names